The Violet Eater (German: Der Veilchenfresser) is a 1926 German silent comedy film directed by Frederic Zelnik and starring Lil Dagover,  Harry Liedtke and Ernö Verebes. It was shot at the Staaken Studios in Berlin. The film's sets were designed by the art director Andrej Andrejew. It premiered at the Marmorhaus in Germany's capital.

Cast
 Lil Dagover as Melitta von Arthof 
 Harry Liedtke as Victor von Ronay  
 Ernö Verebes as Bobby Sterzl  
 Theodor Loos as Herr von Golitzki  
 Dary Holm as Frau von Routt  
 Evi Eva as Lilly Niedegg  
 Hans Behrendt as Peter  
 Maria Paudler as Resi  
 Gustav Adolf Semler as Rittmeister 
 Ernst Behmer as Wachtmeister  
 Ida Perry

References

Bibliography
 Grange, William. Cultural Chronicle of the Weimar Republic. Scarecrow Press, 2008.

External links

1926 films
Films of the Weimar Republic
German silent feature films
Films directed by Frederic Zelnik
German comedy films
German black-and-white films
German films based on plays
1926 comedy films
Silent comedy films
1920s German films
Films shot at Staaken Studios